Educor is a supplier of private tertiary education in South Africa. Educor is an abbreviation for the Education Investment Corporation Limited. Educor owns various brands, including Damelin, CityVarsity, ICESA, Durban Central Technical College, Intec College, Damelin Correspondence College, and Lyceum College. Educor owns over 40 campuses and has over 280 000 students in its student population, as of 2010. In January 2008, Educor was purchased from Media 24 by National Pride Trading 452 (Pty) Ltd.

References

External links
Educor's official site

Higher education in South Africa